Quebrangulo (Brazilian Portuguese: /kebɾɐ̃ˈgulu/) is a municipality located in the Brazilian state of Alagoas. Its population was 11,248 (2020) and its area is 300 km².

The municipality contains part of the  Pedra Talhada Biological Reserve, a fully protected conservation unit created in 1989.

Notable people
 Graciliano Ramos, writer

References

Municipalities in Alagoas